Mount Knox is a peak rising to about  at the west extremity of the MacDonald Hills in the Asgard Range of Victoria Land, Antarctica. It is found on the north side of Taylor Valley. It was named by the New Zealand Geographic Board (NZGB) in 1998 after Professor Emeritus George A. Knox, formerly of the zoology department of the University of Canterbury, New Zealand. Knox made numerous Antarctic visits and established the university's Antarctic Research Unit, active from 1961 to 1981.

References 

Mountains of the Asgard Range
McMurdo Dry Valleys